Listen is a 2013 American thriller/sci-fi/comedy film written/directed by F.C.Rabbath. The story is based on a short film by the same writer/director made in 2007. The film stars Joshua Mikel, Sergio Soltero, Bill Kelly and Lanny Thomas.

The film premiered at the 2013 Portland International Film Festival, and was released to theatres in 2015.

Plot 
David discovers everyone has music inside them and creates a device to manipulate them.

Cast 
 Joshua Mikel as David
 Sergio Soltero as Mark
 Julie Moss as Professor's Wife
 Lanny Thomas as Professor
 Zac Pullam as Young David

Critical reception 
Film Threat strongly recommended the film.

Showed twice at the Portland Film Festival.

Winner at the Wilmore 9 Film Festival

Film selected early showing in the new UHD technology.

References

External links 
 
https://www.allmovie.com/movie/listen-v624601

2013 films
2010s science fiction films
2010s English-language films
American science fiction thriller films
American science fiction comedy films
2010s American films